The Sri Lanka Air Force Sports Club is the governing body for cricket in the Sri Lankan Air Forces. Its representative team, Sri Lanka Air Force, competes in Sri Lanka's domestic competition, the Premier Trophy.

See also
 List of Sri Lankan cricket teams

References

External links
 Sri Lanka Air Force Sports Club at CricketArchive
 Air Force Sports Club at CricInfo

Sri Lankan first-class cricket teams
Military cricket teams